R47 may refer to:
 R47 (London Underground car)
 R47 (South Africa), a road
 R47: May cause birth defects, a risk phrase